The Community Police Accountability Council is a watchdog organization in Chicago proposed following the murder of 17-year-old Laquan McDonald by Chicago Police officer Jason Van Dyke. It was proposed when then-Mayor of Chicago Rahm Emanuel formed the Police Accountability Task Force, which was chaired Lori Lightfoot, who was later elected Mayor after Emanuel stepped down. Presently, only 19 Chicago aldermen support the legislation; support  from  26 aldermen is needed to  pass the legislation. CPAC would be an elected council with a representative from each of Chicago's 22 police districts with the power to both appoint and dismiss the Superintendent of Police, investigate police misconduct, and would be the final authority regarding discipline in the Chicago Police Department.

References

External links
 Chicago Police Department
 Homan Square—series of reports by The Guardian on controversial Chicago Police Department facility

Chicago Police Department
Crime in Chicago